HMS Enchantress (L56) was a  sloop, built for the British Royal Navy. She was the lead ship of her class, being laid down as Bittern, but renamed as Enchantress before being launched by Lady Jean Alice Elaine Cochrane.
She was active during the Second World War, serving mainly as a convoy escort, and was a successful anti-submarine warfare vessel, being credited with the destruction of an Italian submarine in 1942.

Construction
Laid down as Bittern on 9 March 1934 by John Brown of Clydebank, this ship, the first of her class, was one of a series of general purpose vessels that could be employed as escorts in time of war. She was intended for use as an Admiralty yacht, and renamed Enchantress (taking the name of the previous vessel in this role) before launching on 21 October 1934. She completed on 4 April 1935 and commissioned four days later.

Service history
At the outbreak of hostilities in September 1939 Enchantress was allocated to convoy escort duty, coming under the direction of Western Approaches Command. In this role Enchantress was engaged in all the duties performed by escort ships; protecting convoys, searching for and attacking U-boats which attacked ships in convoy, and rescuing survivors. In the six-year Atlantic campaign Enchantress escorted more than 100 trade convoys, mostly on the Gibraltar and South Atlantic routes, ensuring the safe and timely arrival of more than 3,000 ships.

Enchantress was involved in three convoy battles during 1940, and a fourth in 1941, all on the North Atlantic route. Two other convoys escorted by Enchantress were attacked, losing three ships, but she was not present at the time; two other convoys lost ships after dispersal. 
 
In May 1941 Enchantress docked for a refit, and installation of Hedgehog, a new anti-submarine weapon, which she was first to trial. Following this Enchantress was assigned to the South Atlantic route, taking convoys to and from Freetown in Sierra Leone. In January 1942 she was fitted with HF/DF radio-detection gear. In September she was assigned to the escort force for Operation Torch.

Returning to the Atlantic in 1943, Enchantress continued escort duty on the Freetown route, until recalled in May 1945 for refit and deployment to the Pacific. In August she was en route to join the British Pacific Fleet when the Japanese surrender took place.

In 1946 Enchantress returned to the UK and paid off; she was disarmed and sold into merchant service as Lady Enchantress. In 1952 she was discarded and sold for scrap.

Battle Honours
During her service Enchantress was awarded three battle honours:
 Atlantic 1939–45
 Mediterranean 1942
 North Africa 1942–43

Successes
During her service Enchantress was credited with the destruction of one U-boat (enemy submarine):

Notes

References
 

 Hague, Arnold. The Allied Convoy System 1939–1945 (2000).  (Canada);  (UK).
 
 
 
Roskill, Stephen. The War at Sea Vol II (1956)

External links

HMS Enchantress at navalhistory.net
HMS Enchantress at uboat.net
HMS Enchantress at britainsnavy.co.uk

1934 ships
Bittern-class sloops
World War II escort ships of the United Kingdom